Nicolas Gilliard (born 27 October 1947) is a Swiss former breaststroke swimmer. He competed in three events at the 1968 Summer Olympics.

References

External links
 

1947 births
Living people
Swiss male breaststroke swimmers
Olympic swimmers of Switzerland
Swimmers at the 1968 Summer Olympics
People from Davos
Sportspeople from Graubünden
20th-century Swiss people